The Second Stage of the 2007 Copa Libertadores was a group stage.

Format
Twenty-six teams qualified directly into this round, plus six that advanced from the First Stage. This brings the total number of teams in the Second Stage to 32. The teams were drawn into eight groups of four. The teams in each group will play each other in a double round-robin format, playing the other teams in the group once at home and once away. Teams will be awarded 3 points for a win, 1 point for a draw, and 0 points for a loss. The following criteria will be used for breaking ties on points:

superior goal difference;
higher number of goals scored;
higher number of away goals scored;
draw.

The top two teams from each group advanced to the Round of 16.

Groups

Group 1

Group 2

Group 3

Group 4

Group 5

Group 6

Group 7

Group 8

References
RSSSF

2007 Copa Libertadores